The Barrier is a lost 1917 American silent northwoods drama film directed by Edgar Lewis and starring Mabel Julienne Scott. It is based on the 1908 Rex Beach novel The Barrier.

The Beach novel was filmed again by MGM in 1926 as The Barrier starring Lionel Barrymore.

Plot summary 
A barrier stands between Lt. Meade Burrell and Necia, the woman he loves. That barrier is the fact that she's a "half-breed" — half-Indian and half-white, with an Indian mother and John Gale, a white trader, for a father. Although he has proposed marriage to Necia, she releases him from it when she realizes the damage that marrying a half-breed would do to him personally and professionally. One day, a man arrives in town with information that could solve everyone's problems.

Cast
Mabel Julienne Scott as Necia / Merridy
Russell Simpson as John Gaylord / John Gale
Howard Hall as Dan Bennett / Ben Stark
Victor Sutherland as Lt. Meade Burrell
Mitchell Lewis as Poleon Doret
Edward Roseman as Runnion
W. J. Gross as "No Creek" Lee
Mary Carr as Alluna (credited as Mary Kennevan Carr)

References

External links

1917 films
American silent feature films
Films based on American novels
Films based on works by Rex Beach
Lost American films
Silent American drama films
1917 drama films
1917 lost films
Lost drama films
Films directed by Edgar Lewis
1910s American films
1910s English-language films